Lucas Pinheiro Braathen (born 19 April 2000) is a Norwegian World Cup alpine ski racer from Hokksund and represents the sports club Bærums SK.

Braathen is the son of a Norwegian father and a Brazilian mother. His middle name 'Pinheiro' is Portuguese for pine tree, paying tribute to his mother and his Brazilian heritage.

Career
At the Junior World Championships in 2019, Braathen finished fourth and eleventh, followed by a silver medal in super-G, and a bronze medal in the combined event. He made his World Cup debut in December 2018 in Val d'Isere, and collected his first  points (five) with a 26th-place finish.

Braathen recorded his first victory (and podium) in October 2020 at the season opener, a giant slalom in Sölden.  In 2022, he won his first slalom at the Lauberhorn race in Wengen, going from 29th place after the first run to first place after the second run, the largest jump to victory on record.

World Cup results

Season standings

Race podiums

Olympic results

References

External links
 
 
 

2000 births
Living people
Sportspeople from Bærum
Norwegian male alpine skiers
Norwegian people of Brazilian descent
Alpine skiers at the 2022 Winter Olympics
Olympic alpine skiers of Norway